Olaf Josef Johansen  (born 30 May 1879) was a Norwegian politician.

He was born in Christiania to Johan Johansen Reboli and Helene Marie Halvorsen. He was elected representative to the Storting from Oslo for five consecutive periods, first 1925–1927 and last time 1937–1945, for the Labour Party.

References

1879 births
Year of death missing
20th-century Norwegian politicians
Politicians from Oslo
Labour Party (Norway) politicians
Members of the Storting